Red Sonja Unconquered is a 1986 adventure module for the Dungeons & Dragons roleplaying game based on the barbarian heroine, Red Sonja.  Its module code is RS1 and its TSR product code is TSR 9183.  Like the similar barbarian-hero inspired Conan modules (CB1 and CB2), this module was not very popular.

Plot summary
Red Sonja Unconquered is an adventure scenario intended for high-level player characters, featuring Red Sonja.

Publication history
RS1 Red Sonja Unconquered was written by Anne G. McCready, with art by Clyde Caldwell, and was published by TSR in 1986 as a 32-page booklet with a large color map, and an outer folder.

Credits 
 Anne Gray McCready: Author
 Tim Kilpin: Editing
 Clyde Caldwell: Cover & interior art
 Dennis Kauth: Cartography
 Betty Elmore: Typography

Reception
Lawrence Schick, in his 1991 book Heroic Worlds, says that Sonja gets "to an ancient burial ground, where she finds a whole lot of trouble".

See also 
 List of Dungeons & Dragons modules

References 

Adaptations of works by Robert E. Howard
Dungeons & Dragons modules
Red Sonja
Role-playing game supplements introduced in 1986